Allahabad (also Romanized as Allāhābād) is a village in Dasturan Rural District, in the Central District of Joghatai County, Razavi Khorasan Province, Iran. At the 2006 census, its population was 427, in 111 families.

See also 

 List of cities, towns and villages in Razavi Khorasan Province

References 

Populated places in Joghatai County